Phimai is a district (amphoe) in the northeastern part of Nakhon Ratchasima province, northeastern Thailand.

History

Phimai was an ancient Khmer city named Vimai or Vimayapura. A stone pillar dating to the reign of King Suryavarman I was found, naming the city Bhirapura meaning 'strong city'. Phimai was the important city ever since, both during Ayutthaya and Rattanakosin times.

Mueang Phimai district was established in 1900. Khun Khachit Sarakam was the first governor.

Queen Mother Sriphatcharindra (Saovabha) visited Prasat Phimai and Sai Ngam (ficus forest) in 1911. The government officers and people renovated the city for the royal visit, and named six roads to commemorate the event.

In 1940 the government renamed the district by eliminating the word mueang.

Administration
The district is divided into 12 sub-districts (tambons), which are further subdivided into 208 villages (mubans). There are two sub-district municipalities (thesaban tambons): Phimai covering parts of tambon Nai Mueang, and Rang Ka Yai the whole of tambon Rang Ka Yai. There are a further 12 tambon administrative organizations (TAO).

Phimai